Kara-Suu is a district of Osh Region in south-western Kyrgyzstan. The administrative seat lies at the city Kara-Suu.

Population
The district has a sizeable Uzbek minority (38.5% in 2009).

Towns, rural communities and villages
In total, Kara-Suu District include 1 city and 137 settlements in 16 rural communities. Each rural community can consist of one or several villages. The rural communities and settlements in the Kara-Suu District are:
 town Kara-Suu
 Ak-Tash (seat: Ak-Tash; incl. Jylkeldi and Barak)
 Jangy-Aryk (seat: Jangy-Aryk; incl. Ak-Terek, Pravda and Tash-Aryk)
 Joosh (seat: Bolshevik; incl. Agartuu, Gayrat, Zarbalyk, Kalinin, Kommunizm, Kyzyl-Koshchu, Kyzyl-Saray, Madaniyat, Mamajan and Pitomnik)
 Kashgar-Kyshtak (seat: Kashgar-Kyshtak; incl. Alga-Bas, Anjyyan-Maala, Bek-Jar, Jar-Ooz, Kenjekul, Tajik-Maala and Monok)
 Katta-Taldyk (seat: Bash-Bulak; incl. Jangy-Turmush, Kara-Sögöt, Taldyk, Kichik, Kyzyl-Ordo, Sadyrbay, Eshme, Achy and Torgoy-Bulak)
 Kyzyl-Kyshtak (seat: Kyzyl-Kyshtak; incl. Anjyyan, Bel-Kyshtak, Jangy-Kyshtak, Karl Marks, Kommunist and Kyzyl-Bayrak)
 Kyzyl-Suu (seat: Chaychy; incl. Ak-Jar, Korgon, Miyaly, Alpordo, Talaa and Uchkun)
 Mady (seat: Kyrgyz-Chek; incl. Asanchek, Joosh, Kaarman, Laglan, Mady, Oktyabr, Sotsializm, Teeke, Uchkun and Chagyr)
 Nariman (seat: Nariman; incl. Alim-Tepe, Besh-Moynok, VLKSM, Jangy-Maala, Jiydalik, Karatay, Osmon, Kurankol, Kyzyl-Mekhnat, Langar, Nurdar, Jim and Tajikabad)
 Otuz-Adyr (seat: Otuz-Adyr; incl. Kara-Döbö, Kyzyl-Abad, Kysh-Abad, Savay-Aryk, Furkhat, Yntymak, Jangy-Kyzyl-Suu and Tynchtyk)
 Papan (seat: Papan; incl. Ak-Terek, Alchaly, Ata-Merek, Börü, Karagur, Kojo-Keleng, Kyzyl-Tuu, Toguz-Bulak, Ak-Buura-1, Ak-Buura-2, Ak-Buura-3, Ak-Buura-4, Kamyr-Suu, Jar-Bashy, Chychkan-Kol, Andagul and Jany-Turmush)
 Sary-Kolot (seat: Sary-Kolot; incl. Ak-Kolot, Kurban-Kara, Sheraly, Prisavay and Tynchtyk)
 Saray (seat: Kirov; incl. Erkin, Prisavay, Kongurat, Telman and Ak-Orgoo)
 Savay (seat: Kyzyl-Shark; incl. Keng-Say, Köchkön-Jar, Kurban-Kara, Kydyrsha, Oktyabr, Yntymak, Savay and Sultan-Abad)
 Shark (seat: Shark; incl. Tashtak, Imam-Ata, Madaniyat, Top-Terek, Furkat and Medrese)
 Tölöykön (seat: Dyykan-Kyshtak; incl. Kyrgyzstan, Özgür, Tölöykön, Uchar, Bodur-Tash and Japalak)

References 

Districts of Osh Region